Dendropsophus delarivai is a species of frogs in the family Hylidae.

It is found in Bolivia, possibly Brazil, and possibly Peru.

Its natural habitats are subtropical or tropical dry forests, swamps, freshwater marshes, intermittent freshwater marshes, rural gardens, and heavily degraded former forest.

References

delarivai
Amphibians of Bolivia
Frogs of South America
Amphibians described in 2001
Taxonomy articles created by Polbot